Blaesia atra is a beetle of the family Scarabaeidae and subfamily Cetoniinae.

Description
The body is usually black, with dark brown reddish elytra . Antenna are black, with 10 segments. Pronotum and elytra are moderately punctate. Legs and venter have a dense fringe of rust colored setae. This species is associated with ants of Acromyrmex species (myrmecophily).

Distribution
This species occurs in Paraguay, Uruguay, Argentina, Bolivia and southern Brazil.

References
  Encyclopedia of Life
  New World Scarab Beetles
  Brett C. Ratcliffe -   - A review of the Blaesiina (Coleoptera, Scarabaeidae, Cetoniinae, Gymnetini) 

Cetoniinae
Beetles described in 1842
Taxa named by Hermann Burmeister